Bigg Boss Double Trouble (stylized as Bigg Boss: Nau) is the ninth season of the Indian reality TV series  Bigg Boss that premiered on 11 October 2015 on Colors TV. This season ended on 23 January 2016. Salman Khan returned to host the ninth season.
The series won by Prince Narula while Rishabh Sinha became runner up of the show.

Production

House theme
The house theme mainly focuses on aesthetics to adapt to the underlying premiere twist for the ninth season which revolves around the housemates entering the house in pairs rather than as individual housemates. The house sections are replicated to depict places in history and around the globe. The exterior of the house is crafted to recreate the Garden of Eden. It features a fortune teller machine and a wide canopy. The kitchen contains most of its sculptural and art pieces from the architecture of Santorini while the bathroom area follows a glitzy Las Vegas theme. The bathroom walls are lined with mirrors and most of the furniture is crimson. The bedroom contains all double bed and the confession room is situated between the kitchen and the living area as with every series since 2011, featuring a royal themed chair. The housemate wall has been installed for the first time in  house with the LED screens to keep track of housemates' status.

Housemates status

Housemates
The participants in the order of appearance and entered in house are:

Original Entrants
 Digangana Suryavanshi – TV Actress. She is well known for her role of Veera in the show Ek Veer Ki Ardaas...Veera.
 Roopal Tyagi – TV Actress. She is best known for a role of Gunjan in the show Sapne Suhane Ladakpan Ke and was last seen in Jhalak Dikhhla Jaa Reloaded
 Kishwer Merchant – TV Actress. She is mainly known for her portrayal of negative roles. She appeared in the television series Hip Hip Hooray in 1999.
 Suyyash Rai – TV Actor, Singer. Suyyash has been a part of many shows. He met Kishwer on the sets of show Pyaar Kii Ye Ek Kahaani.
 Aman Verma – TV Actor. Aman has appeared in Ekta's show Kyunki Saas Bhi Kabhi Bahu Thi
 Rimi Sen – Film Actress. She was seen in the film Golmaal.
 Yuvika Chaudhary – Actress. She appeared in the reality show India's Best Cinestars Ki Khoj and film Om Shanti Om
 Vikas Bhalla – Actor, Singer. He was last seen in the popular show Uttaran playing Veer. He sung the song 'Po Po' from the film Son Of Sardaar.
 Mandana Karimi – Iranian Film Actress, Model. Mandana appeared in films like Roy and Main Aur Charles.
 Rochelle Rao – Model. She won Miss India in 2012. She appeared in reality shows like Fear Factor: Khatron Ke Khiladi 5 and Jhalak Dikhhla Jaa
 Keith Sequeira – Actor, Model. He appeared in TV shows like Dekho Magar Pyaar Se, Diya Aur Baati Hum and Doli Armaano Ki and appeared in film Calendar Girls
 Prince Narula – Reality Star. Prince was the winner of MTV Roadies 12 and MTV Splitsvilla 8.
 Ankit Gera – TV Actor. He appeared in shows like Mann Kee Awaaz Pratigya and Sapne Suhane Ladakpan Ke.
 Arvind Vegda – Singer. He sung the song 'Bhai Bhai' in the film Goliyon Ki Raasleela Ram-Leela.

Wild Card entries
 Rishabh Sinha – TV Actor. He appeared in the popular series Qubool Hai and reality show MTV Splitsvilla
 Puneet Vashist – Actor. He was last seen in Colors show Shastri Sisters.
 Kanwaljit Singh – Fashion Designer.
 Priya Malik – Teacher. She was a contestant on Big Brother Australia
 Nora Fatehi – Model, Actress. She debuted with the film Roar: Tigers of the Sundarbans
 Gizele Thakral – Model, Actress. She appeared in reality shows Survivor India and Welcome – Baazi Mehmaan Nawazi Ki.

Twist

Pairs

Guest appearances and Special Panel 
This season, like the previous one, also featured a 'Special Panel', where a team of past housemates or their acquaintances would share their and public's views and opinions of the current housemates before the eviction. The panel would rotate every week.

Weekly summary 
The main events in the house are summarized in the table below. A typical week begins with nominations, followed by the shopping task, and then the eviction of a Housemate during the Saturday episode. Evictions, tasks, and other events for a particular week are noted in order of sequence.

Week 15

Nominations table
 

The colors are used to denote the pairs used for nomination in week 1 & 2. They are not necessarily associated to a certain pair.
  indicates that the Housemate was directly nominated for eviction.
  indicates that the Housemate was immune prior to nominations.
  indicates the winner.
  indicates the first runner up.
  indicates the second runner up.
  indicates the third runner up.
  indicates the contestant has been evicted.
  indicates the contestant walked out due to emergency.
  indicates the contestant has been ejected.
  house captain.
  indicates the contestant is nominated.

Nomination notes
 Housemates entered the house in seven pairs. Each pair nominated another pair with consensus when called into the confession room. Vote against a pair added one vote against each individual in the respective pair. Housemates therefore faced eviction individually.
 Pairings were revised prior to this week's nominations.
 Each pair had to nominate two pairs for eviction. After nominations, the pairs with the most votes were revealed. Each of those pairs had to then decide among themselves which one of them would voluntarily put themselves up for eviction saving the other.

References

External links

09
2015 Indian television seasons